Samuel "Sam" Rothschild (October 16, 1899 – April 15, 1987) was a Canadian professional ice hockey player who played 102 games in the National Hockey League (NHL).  Rothschild was the first Jewish player in the NHL. He played for the Montreal Maroons, Pittsburgh Pirates, and New York Americans. He was the last surviving member of the 1926 Stanley Cup champion Maroons.

Early life
Rothschild was born in Sudbury, Ontario, to Daniel and Annie Rothschild, the city's first Jewish settlers. Daniel Rothschild was a merchant in the city, whose retail and office property is listed on the city's register of historic properties.

Playing career
Rothschild played hockey in the Montreal area for Montreal Harmonia, McGill University, and the Montreal Stars before returning home to play for the junior Sudbury Wolves in 1919. He played the next four seasons with the senior Sudbury Wolves before joining the expansion Montreal Maroons in 1924, becoming the first Jewish player in the NHL. He played three seasons with the Maroons before being sold to the Pirates in 1927. He finished the 1927–28 season with the New York Americans after being suspended by the Pirates in December 1927. It was his last season in the NHL.

Post-NHL career
Following his retirement from the NHL Rothschild took up coaching, and coached the junior Sudbury Wolves to the 1932 Memorial Cup championship. He married Eva Yackman in 1933.

He was also a prominent supporter of curling in the city, including stints as president of the Northern Ontario Curling Association and the Canadian Curling Association from 1957 to 1958, and securing the city's status as host city of the 1953 Brier. He was later inducted into the Canadian Curling Hall of Fame.

As well, he served for two years on Sudbury's city council. He died at a hospital in Sudbury on April 15, 1987.

Career statistics

Regular season and playoffs

See also
List of select Jewish ice hockey players

References

External links 

1899 births
1987 deaths
Canadian ice hockey left wingers
Curling Canada presidents
Jewish Canadian politicians
Jewish Canadian sportspeople
Jewish ice hockey players
Montreal Maroons players
New York Americans players
Pittsburgh Pirates (NHL) players
Sudbury, Ontario city councillors
Stanley Cup champions
Ice hockey people from Ontario
Sportspeople from Greater Sudbury